Goff Creek may refer to:

Goff Creek (Missouri), a stream in Missouri
Goff Creek Lodge, a dude ranch in Yellowstone National Park